Cerda may refer to:

Places
 Cerda, municipality in the Province of Palermo, Italy
 Cerdà, municipality in the Valencian Community, Spain
 Ildefons Cerdà (Barcelona Metro), railway station in Barcelona
 Pedro Aguirre Cerda, Chile, commune in Santiago Province, Chile

People
Cerdá Spanish spelling
 Antonio Cerdá, Argentine professional golfer
Cerdà Catalan spelling
 Ildefons Cerdà, Catalan urban planner
 Nacho Cerdà, Catalan film director
Agustí Cerdà i Argent 1965) Catalan politician
De la Cerda
 Charles de la Cerda, Franco-Castilian nobleman
 Pedro Messía de la Cerda, Spanish naval officer
Cerda
 Emmanuel Cerda, Mexican football player
 Pedro Aguirre Cerda,  (1879–1941) President of Chile, 1938-1941
 Jaime Cerda, Major League Baseball pitcher
 David Cerda, American playwright

See also
 Serda